Mabel Cahill won the singles tennis title by defeating reigning champion Ellen Roosevelt  6–4, 6–1, 4–6, 6–3 in the Challenge Round of the 1891 U.S. Women's National Singles Championship. Cahill had won the right to challenge Ellen Roosevelt by defeating her sister Grace Roosevelt 6–3, 7–5 in the final of the All Comers' competition. The event was played on outdoor grass courts and held at the Philadelphia Cricket Club in Chestnut Hill, Philadelphia from June 23 through June 27, 1891.

The event is notable for its change from a best-of-three to a best-of-five format in the final round, a format that continued until 1901, excluding 1893. This was, and still is, unusual for a women's tournament, and was the only stretch of time where a best-of-five format was played at a women's grand slam event.

Draw

Challenge round

All Comers' finals

References

1891
1891 in American women's sports
Women's Singles
1891 in women's tennis
Chestnut Hill, Philadelphia
1891 in Pennsylvania
Women's sports in Pennsylvania